Oxogestone phenpropionate (OPP) (former developmental code name or tentative brand name Oxageston), also known as xinogestone, as well as 20β-hydroxy-19-norprogesterone 20β-(3-phenylpropionate), is a progestin related to the 19-norprogesterone derivatives which was developed as an injectable hormonal contraceptive, specifically a progestogen-only injectable contraceptive, in the 1960s and early 1970s but was never marketed. It was studied at a dose of 50 to 75 mg once a month by intramuscular injection but was associated with a high failure rate with this regimen and was not further developed. OPP is the 20β-(3-phenylpropionate) ester of oxogestone, which, similarly, was never marketed.

See also
 List of progestogen esters

References

Abandoned drugs
Hormonal contraception
Norpregnanes
Phenylpropionate esters
Progestogen esters
Progestogens